Ronald Stern (born January 11, 1967) is a Canadian former professional ice hockey player who played in the National Hockey League for 12 seasons with the Vancouver Canucks, Calgary Flames, and San Jose Sharks.

Playing career
Stern was born in Sainte-Agathe-des-Monts, Quebec, Canada, and is Jewish.  He played for 3 years in the QMJHL with the Longueuil Chevaliers, establishing himself as an enforcer with a scoring touch. His strong play led him to be drafted by the Vancouver Canucks in the 4th round, 70th overall, in the 1986 NHL Entry Draft.

After being drafted by the Canucks, Stern returned to the Chevaliers for one final year before turning pro for the 1987–88 season. That year he played the majority of the season with the Flint Spirits of the IHL, appearing in 55 games and registering 294 Penalty Minutes. He also made his debut with the Canucks, playing in 15 games. The next three years saw Stern bounce between the Canucks and their minor league affiliate Milwaukee Admirals.

At the trade deadline near the end of the 1990–1991 season Stern was traded from the Canucks to the Calgary Flames in a deal for Dana Murzyn. In Calgary, Stern established himself as a full-time NHLer, and earned a reputation as a feared fighter amongst fellow NHL heavyweights at six feet and more than 200 pounds.  Stern played the majority of his NHL career with the Flames, spending 6 years with the team and enjoying his best success in the NHL. He set career highs with 13 goals in the 1991–92 campaign, and with 29 points in 1993–94.

Stern missed the entire 1997–1998 season recovering from knee surgery but was signed by the San Jose Sharks upon recovery. He played two seasons with the Sharks before retiring in 2000. He scored the first goal in Game 7 of the Sharks upset over the top seed St. Louis Blues in 2000.

As of April 5, 2007, Stern ranked 44th all-time in NHL penalty minutes with 2077 PIM. Over the course of his career, he registered 75 goals and 86 assists for 161 points in 638 NHL games.

Stern is also cousins with American hockey player, Will Hershon.

Career statistics

See also
List of select Jewish ice hockey players
List of NHL players with 2,000 career penalty minutes

References

External links

1967 births
Calgary Flames players
Flint Spirits players
Fredericton Canadiens players
Ice hockey people from Quebec
Jewish Canadian sportspeople
Jewish ice hockey players
Living people
Longueuil Chevaliers players
Milwaukee Admirals (IHL) players
People from Sainte-Agathe-des-Monts
San Jose Sharks players
Vancouver Canucks draft picks
Vancouver Canucks players
Canadian ice hockey right wingers